Kiara Briggitte Rodriguez (born 12 December 2002) is an Ecuadorian Paralympic athlete who competes in sprint and long jump events in international level events.

References

External links
 

2002 births
Living people
Sportspeople from Guayaquil
Ecuadorian female sprinters
Ecuadorian long jumpers
World Para Athletics Championships winners
Medalists at the 2019 Parapan American Games
Athletes (track and field) at the 2020 Summer Paralympics
Medalists at the 2020 Summer Paralympics
Paralympic bronze medalists for Ecuador
Paralympic medalists in athletics (track and field)
21st-century Ecuadorian women